One Ordinary Day is a South Korean web series starring Kim Soo-hyun and Cha Seung-won. It is based on the British television series Criminal Justice written by Peter Moffat. It premiered on Coupang Play in South Korea on November 27, 2021. It is streaming exclusively through Viu outside South Korea.

Synopsis
On an ordinary day, a day no different from any other, a straight up university student Kim Hyun Soo makes the mistake of his life. Just as any other college kid would do, Hyun Soo is on his way to hang out with his friends. Late night, he takes his father’s taxi to head over to where his friends are. Hong Guk Hwa, a sad-looking mysterious girl mistakes Hyun Soo’s taxi for an on-duty cab and hops in. That was the beginning of everything. All the choices Hyun Soo made that night leads the normal university student to become the prime suspect of a violent murder case. While Hyun Soo shivers from fear and the fact that he is falsely accused, everyone still points at him as the only possible murderer. In this hopeless situation, those who stretch a helping hand are a low-life attorney, Shin Joong Han, and a criminal king who rules the prison food chain, Do Ji Tae. To prove his innocence in any way possible, Hyun Soo gives everything he got to fight against the police and the Korean prosecution.

Cast

Main
 Kim Soo-hyun as Kim Hyun-soo
 A normal college student whose life turns upside down when he unexpectedly becomes the key suspect of the murder case.
 Cha Seung-won as Shin Joong-han
 A lawyer who barely passed the bar exam and the only person who reaches out to help Kim Hyun-soo.
 Kim Sung-kyu as Do Ji-tae
 A violent criminal who has been serving a prison sentence for 10 years and has control over the prison.

Supporting
 Kim Hong-pa as Park Sang-beom, the head of the detective department working on Hyun-soo's case
 Kim Shin-rok as Ahn Tae-hee, a prosecutor working on Hyun-soo's case 
 Yang Kyung-won as Park Doo-sik
 Lee Seol as Seo Soo-jin, a rookie lawyer who follows Hyun-soo's case
 Jung Ji-ho, a National Forensic Service (NFS) staff
 Kim Young-ah as Hong Jeong-ah, a NFS staff
 Moon Ye-won as Kang Da-kyung, a journalist who investigates Hyun-soo's case to write exclusive articles

Others
Hwang Se-on as Hong Gook-hwa
 Kim Yoo-jung as Joong-han's new client (cameo)

Production
On January 5, 2021, it was announced that The Studio M, Chorokbaem Media and Gold Medalist would co-produce a television series based on the British Broadcasting Corporation (BBC) crime series Criminal Justice. BBC Studios confirmed the adaptation on January 13, through its media centre. Kim Soo-hyun and Cha Seung-won stars in leading roles, Kwon Soon-kyu wrote the screenplay, and Lee Myung-woo directed the series. Filming began in the first half of 2021. It is Coupang Play's first original series with exclusive broadcast rights in South Korea.

Awards and nominations

References

External links
 
 
 
 

Korean-language television shows
2021 web series debuts
2021 web series endings
South Korean television series based on British television series
South Korean crime television series
South Korean thriller television series
South Korean legal television series
Television series by Chorokbaem Media
Television series by Gold Medalist (company)